Hymenobacter norwichensis  is a bacterium from the genus of Hymenobacter which has been isolated from air from the Centre for Visual Arts in the United Kingdom.

References

External links
Type strain of Hymenobacter norwichensis at BacDive -  the Bacterial Diversity Metadatabase	

norwichensis
Bacteria described in 2006